Simon Hazlitt (born 16 October 1966) is a British former field hockey player who competed in the 1996 Summer Olympics.
A long-standing member of Winchester Hockey Club, he was elected club president in May 2012. He continues to coach Junior players in the club.

He was formerly the information director at Majedie Asset Management. He currently is the CEO of Supl Ltd.

He is married to Karen and has three children Annabel, Olivia and Freddie and 2 dogs Rosie and Mabel.

References

External links
 

1965 births
Living people
British male field hockey players
Olympic field hockey players of Great Britain
Field hockey players at the 1996 Summer Olympics